David Duke Jr. (born October 13, 1999) is an American professional basketball player for the Brooklyn Nets of the National Basketball Association (NBA), on a two-way contract with the Long Island Nets of the NBA G League. He played college basketball for the Providence Friars.

High school career
Duke grew up in Providence, Rhode Island, playing soccer and football and running track. He did not focus on basketball until high school. As a freshman at Classical High School in Providence, Duke stood 5 ft 6 in (1.68 m) and played at the junior varsity level. Duke grew to 6 ft 1 in (1.85 m) and joined the varsity team in his sophomore season. As a junior, he averaged 15 points per game and led his team to a Division 1 state title. After the season, Duke transferred to Cushing Academy in Ashburnham, Massachusetts and repeated his junior year due to reclassification. He played with Wabissa Bede and helped his team win the New England Preparatory School Athletic Council (NEPSAC) Class AA title. As a senior, Duke averaged 17 points, five rebounds and four assists per game and helped Cushing reach the NEPSAC Class AA semifinals. A four-star recruit, he committed to playing college basketball for Providence over offers from Virginia Tech, Florida, Indiana and Villanova.

College career
Entering his first season at Providence, Duke shared preseason Big East Freshman of the Year honors with Jahvon Quinerly. He immediately became the team's starting point guard but moved off the ball by the end of the season. On November 17, 2018, Duke scored a freshman season-high 20 points in a 76–67 win over South Carolina. As a freshman, he averaged 7.1 points, 2.6 rebounds and 2.1 assists per game. On January 18, 2020, Duke scored a sophomore season-high 36 points, shooting 6-of-8 from three-point range, in a 78–74 loss to Creighton. As a sophomore, he averaged 12 points, 4.2 rebounds, 3.1 assists and 1.5 steals per game, shooting 42 percent on three-pointers. Duke averaged 16.8 points, 6.3 rebounds and 4.8 assists per game as a junior. He was named to the Second Team All-Big East. On April 2, 2021, Duke declared for the 2021 NBA draft, forgoing his remaining college eligibility.

Professional career

Brooklyn Nets (2021–present) 
After going undrafted in the 2021 NBA draft, Duke signed with the Brooklyn Nets on August 8, 2021. On October 16, his deal was converted to a two-way contract. Under the terms of the deal, he split time between the Nets and their NBA G League affiliate, the Long Island Nets.

Duke joined the Nets for the 2022 NBA Summer League after turning down a new two-way contract offer from the team. However, he ultimately re-signed with the Nets on a two-way deal on September 16. Duke was named to the G League's inaugural Next Up Game for the 2022–23 season.

National team career
Duke represented the United States at the 2019 Pan American Games in Peru. He helped his team win the bronze medal and recorded 16 points, four assists and three steals in a 114–75 loss to Argentina in the semifinals.

Career statistics

NBA

|-
| style="text-align:left;"| 
| style="text-align:left;"| Brooklyn
| 22 || 7 || 15.5 || .361 || .243 || .810 || 3.0 || .8 || .6 || .3 || 4.7
|- class="sortbottom"
| style="text-align:center;" colspan="2"| Career
| 22 || 7 || 15.5 || .361 || .243 || .810 || 3.0 || .8 || .6 || .3 || 4.7

College

|-
| style="text-align:left;"| 2018–19
| style="text-align:left;"| Providence
| 34 || 34 || 24.7 || .387 || .297 || .689 || 2.6 || 2.1 || .7 || .3 || 7.1
|-
| style="text-align:left;"| 2019–20
| style="text-align:left;"| Providence
| 31 || 31 || 32.2 || .409 || .420 || .793 || 4.2 || 3.1 || 1.5 || .4 || 12.0
|-
| style="text-align:left;"| 2020–21
| style="text-align:left;"| Providence
| 26 || 26 || 37.1 || .387 || .389 || .792 || 6.3 || 4.8 || 1.2 || .3 || 16.8
|- class="sortbottom"
| style="text-align:center;" colspan="2"| Career
| 91 || 91 || 30.8 || .394 || .377 || .769 || 4.2 || 3.2 || 1.1 || .3 || 11.5

Personal life
Duke's parents were born in Liberia. He has two brothers.

References

External links
Providence Friars bio

1999 births
Living people
American men's basketball players
American people of Liberian descent
Basketball players at the 2019 Pan American Games
Basketball players from Rhode Island
Brooklyn Nets players
Classical High School alumni
Long Island Nets players
Medalists at the 2019 Pan American Games
Pan American Games bronze medalists for the United States
Pan American Games medalists in basketball
Point guards
Providence Friars men's basketball players
Shooting guards
Sportspeople from Providence, Rhode Island
United States men's national basketball team players
Undrafted National Basketball Association players